The year 2002 in art involves various significant events.

Events
21 May – Extensions to the Queen's Gallery at Buckingham Palace, London, designed by John Simpson, are opened.
3 July – Decapitation of a statue of Margaret Thatcher: a man decapitates a statue of former Prime Minister of the United Kingdom Margaret Thatcher on display at the Guildhall Art Gallery in the City of London.
10 July – At a Sotheby's auction, Peter Paul Rubens' painting The Massacre of the Innocents is sold for £49.5million (US$76.2 million) to Lord Thomson of Fleet.
13 July – Baltic Centre for Contemporary Art opens in the converted Baltic Flour Mill at Gateshead in North East England.
29 August – Frida, a biopic starring Salma Hayek as Frida Kahlo, receives its world première at the Venice International Film Festival. 
22 November – Eric Carle Museum of Picture Book Art opens to the public in Amherst, Massachusetts.
14 December – New building for the Modern Art Museum of Fort Worth in Texas, designed by Tadao Ando, opens to the public.

Full date unknown
A sculpture by Henri Matisse, Reclining Nude I (Dawn), is sold for US$9.2 million, a record for a Matisse sculpture at the time.

Exhibitions
September 12 until October 22 - "Mike Bidlo: Not Picasso, Not Pollock, Not Warhol at the Astrup Fearnley Museum of Modern Art in Oslo, Norway.

Awards
Archibald Prize – Cherry Hood, Simon Tedeschi Unplugged
Beck's Futures – Toby Paterson
Hugo Boss Prize – Pierre Huyghe
John Moores Painting Prize - Peter Davies for "Super Star Fucker - Andy Warhol Text Painting"
Turner Prize – Keith Tyson
Wynne Prize – Angus Nivision, Remembering Rain

Works

Magdalena Abakanowicz – Nierozpoznani ("The Unrecognised Ones", sculpture)
Banksy – Balloon Girl (mural, London) 
Patricia Cronin – "Memorial to a Marriage" at Woodlawn Cemetery in The Bronx, New York
Ken Currie – Three Oncologists
Da Tung and Xi'an Bao Bao (bronze, Portland, Oregon)
Helen Frankenthaler - Contentment Island
Lucian Freud – Portrait of David Hockney
Gwen Gillen – Mary Tyler Moore (statue, Minneapolis, Minnesota)
Anish Kapoor – Marsyas (Tate Modern, London)
Ron Mueck – Mask II (sculpture)
Claes Oldenburg and Coosje van Bruggen – Cupid's Span (sculpture, San Francisco)
Moises Cabrera Orozco – Statue of Benito Juárez (cast in Mexico 2002; installed in Bryant Park, Manhattan, New York City 2004)
Neo Rauch
Hunt (Hatz)
Reactionary Situation (Reaktionäre Situation)
William Wegman – Dog Bowl (sculpture, Portland, Oregon)
Olbram Zoubek, Jan Kerel and Zdeněk Holzel – "Memorial to the Victims of Communism" in Prague

Deaths

January to June
30 January – Inge Morath, Austrian photographer (b. 1923)
February – Víctor Grippo, painter, engraver and sculptor, the father of conceptual art in Argentina (b. 1936)
 16 February – Peter Voulkos, American ceramic sculptor (b. 1924)
12 March – Jean-Paul Riopelle, Canadian painter and sculptor (b. 1923)
22 May – Niki de Saint Phalle, French sculptor, painter, and film maker (b. 1930).
12 June – Bill Blass, American fashion designer (b. 1922).

July to December
8 July – Ward Kimball, American Academy Award-winning animator (b. 1914).
13 July – Yousuf Karsh, Armenian-Canadian photographer (b. 1908).
17 July – George Rickey, American kinetic sculptor (b. 1907).
5 August – Robert Lenkiewicz, English painter (b. 1941).
11 August – Galen Rowell, American wilderness photographer, in aviation accident (b. 1940).
22 August – Richard Lippold, American sculptor (b. 1915).
19 October - Guy Krohg, Norwegian painter (b. 1917).
18 November – Bryan Robertson, English curator (b. 1925).
23 November – Roberto Matta, Chilean painter (b. 1911).
9 December
Ian Hornak, American painter and draughtsman (b. 1944).
Stan Rice, American poet and artist (b. 1942).
26 December – Herb Ritts, American photographer (b. 1952).

References

 
 
2000s in art
Years of the 21st century in art